Chanel Elisabeth Miller (born June 12, 1992) is an American writer and artist based in San Francisco, California and New York City. She was known anonymously after she was sexually assaulted on the campus of Stanford University in 2015 by Brock Allen Turner. The following year, her victim impact statement at his sentencing hearing went viral after it was published online by BuzzFeed, being read 11 million times within four days. Miller was referred to as "Emily Doe" in court documents and media reports until September 2019, when she relinquished her anonymity and released her memoir Know My Name: A Memoir. The book won the 2019 National Book Critics Circle Award for Autobiographies and was named in several national book lists of the year. She is credited with sparking national discussion in the United States about the treatment of sexual assault cases and victims by college campuses and court systems. She is also a public speaker.

Early life
Chanel Miller was born in 1992 in Palo Alto, California, the elder of two daughters of a Chinese mother and an American father. Her mother emigrated from China to become a writer and her father is a retired therapist. Miller graduated from Gunn High School in 2010. She attended the University of California, Santa Barbara's College of Creative Studies from which she graduated with a degree in literature in 2014.

Assault and victim impact statement in 2015

On the evening of January 17, 2015, Miller accompanied her sister to a Kappa Alpha fraternity party at Stanford University; later that night, two Stanford graduate students found Miller lying on the ground behind a dumpster with another Stanford student, 19-year-old Brock Turner, on top of her. Miller was unconscious, her blood alcohol level was estimated to have been 0.22% at the time of the assault. When Turner tried to flee, he was caught and held down on the ground by the two graduate students as they waited for police to arrive. Turner was arrested and indicted on five felony sexual assault charges, to which he pleaded not guilty. In 2016, he was convicted of three of these charges and was sentenced to six months' imprisonment, sparking public outrage due to the sentence's leniency. Sentencing judge Aaron Persky was recalled two years later.

The 7,137-word-long victim impact statement by Miller—who was referred to in court documents and media reports as "Emily Doe"—was published by BuzzFeed on June 3, 2016, the day after Turner was sentenced, and was reprinted in other major news outlets such as The New York Times. The victim impact statement was read 11 million times in four days after it was published, going viral.

Know My Name: A Memoir 

On August 9, 2019, 60 Minutes released an interview with Miller—who decided to go public with her name. She described her story and the consequences of being anonymous, and met the two students who stopped Turner. Miller's memoir entitled Know My Name: A Memoir was published on September 4, 2019 by Viking Books and became a best-seller. The book won the 2019 National Book Critics Circle Award for Autobiographies and was named one of the top ten books of the year by The Washington Post. The New York Times also selected Know My Name for its "100 Notable Books of 2019." The Dayton Literary Peace Prize selected the book as its 2020 non-fiction winner.

Artwork
After her assault, Miller started taking art courses at the recommendation by her therapist. In the summer of 2015, Miller attended a printmaking class at Rhode Island School of Design in Providence, Rhode Island.

In 2020, a mural drawn by Miller appeared in the Asian Art Museum in San Francisco. The -long and -tall mural shows three vignettes of a cartoon figure, and the phrases "I was", "I am", and "I will be". The museum was closed to the public due to COVID-19, though the mural is visible through the windows facing Hyde Street.

Recognition 
Miller's assault story and the legal case "sparked a nationwide discussion about rape on college campuses and how survivors were not being heard", and "became part of the intense debates around rape, sexism and sexual misconduct over the past years," including the Me Too movement.

On November 1, 2016, Glamour named Miller, then known only as Emily Doe, a Woman of the Year for "changing the conversation about sexual assault forever", citing that her impact statement had been read over 11 million times. Miller attended the award ceremony anonymously.
She accepted the award on stage in November 2019 after the publication of her book. She delivered a poem at the ceremony in which she advocated for the well-being of sexual assault survivors. She was listed as an influential person in Time 2019 100 Next list. In 2019, Stanford University installed a plaque on campus memorializing the assault.

Publications
 Know My Name: A Memoir (2019)

References

External links 
 
 Victim Impact Statement as Published by Buzzfeed

1992 births
Living people
21st-century American women writers
American writers of Chinese descent
American women writers of Chinese descent
American victims of crime
Sexual abuse victim advocates
University of California, Santa Barbara alumni
Writers from San Francisco
Writers from Palo Alto, California
American women memoirists
21st-century American memoirists
Gunn High School alumni